Hypsipyla swezeyi is a species of snout moth in the genus Hypsipyla. It was described by Tams in 1935. It is found on Samoa.

References

Moths described in 1935
Phycitini